Hollywood Brass may refer to:

An episode of CSI: Crime Scene Investigation (season 5)
An orchestra formed by Jerry Fielding